Inverness Caledonian Thistle F.C. in their 15th season in Scottish football competing in the Scottish Premier League, Scottish League Cup and the Scottish Cup in season 2008–09.

Results

Scottish Premier League

Final League table

Scottish League Cup

Scottish Cup

References
caleythistleonline

Inverness Caledonian Thistle F.C. seasons
Inverness Caledonian Thistle